Australia participated in the Eurovision Song Contest 2022 in Turin, Italy. The Australian broadcaster Special Broadcasting Service (SBS) selected Sheldon Riley with "Not the Same" to represent the country, after he won Eurovision – Australia Decides on 26 February 2022.

On 17 November 2015, the EBU announced that SBS had been invited to participate in the 2016 contest and that Australia would once again take part. In 2015, Australia was guaranteed a spot in the final of the contest and was allowed to vote during both semi-finals and the final; however, from the 2016 contest and onwards, Australia would have to qualify to the final from one of two semi-finals and could only vote in the semi-final in which the nation was allocated to compete.

Australia was drawn to compete in the second semi-final of the Eurovision Song Contest which took place on 12 May 2022. Performing during the show in position 8, "Not the Same" was announced among the top 10 entries of the second semi-final and hence qualified to compete in the final. In the final, Australia placed 15th with 125 points. It was later revealed that the country placed 2nd in the semi-final with 243 points.

Background 
Special Broadcasting Service (SBS) has broadcast the Eurovision Song Contest since 1983, and the contest has gained a cult following over that time, primarily due to the country's strong political and cultural ties with Europe. Paying tribute to this, the 2014 contest semi-finals included an interval act featuring Australian singer Jessica Mauboy. Australian singers have also participated at Eurovision as representatives of other countries, including Olivia Newton-John, two-time winner Johnny Logan ( and), Gina G (United Kingdom), and Jane Comerford as lead singer of Texas Lightning.

Tying in with the goal of Eurovisionto showcase "the importance of bringing countries together to celebrate diversity, music and culture", the 2015 theme of "Building Bridges", and arguing that they could not hold "the world's biggest party" to celebrate the 60th edition of Eurovision without inviting Australia, the EBU announced on 10 February 2015 that the country would compete at that year's edition as a special guest participant. Along with the "Big 5" (France, Germany, Italy, Spain and the United Kingdom), and the host country of Austria, Australia was given automatic entry into the final to "not reduce the chances" of the semi-final participants. On 17 November 2015, the EBU announced that SBS had been invited to participate in the 2016 contest and that Australia would once again take part, however they would have to qualify for the final from one of two semi-finals and could only vote in the semi-final in which the nation was competing. On 12 February 2019, SBS signed a contract securing Australia's spot at the contest until 2023. In , Australia was represented by Montaigne and the song "Technicolour". The country ended in fourteenth place in the first semi-final with 28 points, therefore failing to qualify for the final for the first time. On 16 June 2021, SBS confirmed Australia's participation in the 2022 contest, with Eurovision – Australia Decides returning to choose the entry.

Before Eurovision

Eurovision – Australia Decides 2022 
Eurovision – Australia Decides was the national final organised by SBS in order to select the Australian entry for the Eurovision Song Contest 2022. The competition took place at the Convention and Exhibition Centre in Gold Coast on 26 February 2022, hosted by Myf Warhurst and Joel Creasey. Eleven artists and songs competed with the winner being determined by a combination of public and jury voting. The show was broadcast on SBS as well as streamed online at SBS On Demand.

Competing entries 
On 26 August 2021, SBS announced an open submission for interested songwriters to submit their songs online until 26 September 2021. Over half of the composers or songwriters of a song were required to be citizens or permanent residents of Australia and songs were required to be in English or an Aboriginal and Torres Strait Islander language. Ten songs were selected for the competition from the received submissions and performers of the selected songs were determined by SBS in consultation with the songwriters. The chosen competing acts were announced in three sets: the first on 28 October 2021, the second on 26 November 2021, and the third on 14 December 2021. Simultaneous to the final artist reveal, it was announced that an eleventh 'wildcard artist' would be selected through a TikTok contest. Candidates were required to send a live vocal performance clip of any particular song, up to one minute long, with submissions opened until 16 January 2022. Erica Padilla was the selected candidate.

Final 
The final took place on 26 February 2022. The combination of public votes (50%) and a five-member jury (50%) selected the winner. The jury consisted of Alexandra Rotan from Keiino, Darren Hayes of the group Savage Garden, Millie Petriella from APRA AMCOS, Emily Griggs, the SBS Head of Food and Entertainment, and Creative Director and producer Paul Clarke. Moreover, for the first time, the public votes were ranked. According to producer Paul Clarke, the most points an act could get was the same amount that such act could get from the jury. In addition to the performances of the competing entries, the show was opened by Keiino, who represented Norway in the Eurovision Song Contest 2019, and Montaigne, who represented Australia in the Eurovision Song Contest 2021. Montaigne also performed as an interval act together with David Byrne.

At Eurovision 
According to Eurovision rules, all nations with the exceptions of the host country and the "Big Five" (France, Germany, Italy, Spain and the United Kingdom) are required to qualify from one of two semi-finals in order to compete for the final; the top ten countries from each semi-final progress to the final. The European Broadcasting Union (EBU) split up the competing countries into six different pots based on voting patterns from previous contests, with countries with favourable voting histories put into the same pot. On 25 January 2022, an allocation draw was held which placed each country into one of the two semi-finals, as well as which half of the show they would perform in. Australia has been placed into the second semi-final, to be held on 12 May 2022, and has been scheduled to perform in the first half of the show.

Once all the competing songs for the 2022 contest had been released, the running order for the semi-finals was decided by the shows' producers rather than through another draw, so that similar songs were not placed next to each other. Later, Australia was voted to continue in the competition in the grand final, being selected to perform in the second half of the show in position 21, following the entry from Sweden and before the entry from the United Kingdom.

In the grand final, Australia finished in position 15 with 125 points.

Voting

Points awarded to Australia

Points awarded by Australia

Detailed voting results
The following members comprised the Australian jury:
 Bridget Hustwaite
 Dylan Thomas Lewis
 Matt Okine
 Milly Petriella
 Montaigne

References

External links 
 
 

2022
Countries in the Eurovision Song Contest 2022
Eurovision
Eurovision